Héctor Ignacio Santos (29 October 1944-7 May 2019 ) is a retired Uruguayan football goalkeeper.

Career
During his club career, Santos played for CA Bella Vista, Nacional and Alianza Lima. He represented the Uruguay national football team 14 times and played in the 1970 FIFA World Cup and the 1974 FIFA World Cup.

References

1944 births
Living people
Association football goalkeepers
Uruguayan footballers
Uruguayan expatriate footballers
Uruguay international footballers
Defensor Sporting players
Peñarol players
C.A. Bella Vista players
Club Nacional de Football players
Club Alianza Lima footballers
Barcelona S.C. footballers
Centro Atlético Fénix players
Club de Deportes Green Cross footballers
C.A. Cerro players
Chilean Primera División players
Uruguayan Primera División players
Expatriate footballers in Chile
Expatriate footballers in Ecuador
Expatriate footballers in Peru
1970 FIFA World Cup players
1974 FIFA World Cup players